TVK may refer to:

 Confederation of Salaried Employees, a former national trade union centre in Finland
 National Television of Kampuchea, codenamed TVK.
 Television Kanagawa
 Southeast Ambrym language